Esix Snead (born June 7, 1976) is an American former professional baseball outfielder for the New York Mets of the Major League Baseball (MLB). Snead was known for his speed, with 507 stolen bases in only 9 minor league seasons, but only four in two brief appearances with the New York Mets.

College career
Snead attended the University of Central Florida, playing both baseball and football.

Professional career

St. Louis Cardinals
Snead was drafted by the St. Louis Cardinals in the 18th round of the 1998 Major League Baseball Draft. Throughout his entire career, Snead hit for a low batting average, but still stole high numbers of bases. In  with the Low-A New Jersey Cardinals, he hit .233 and stole 42 bases in 58 games. The  season was Snead's career year. Playing for the Cannons again, he led all minor leaguers in stolen bases and stole a Carolina League record 109 bases, breaking Lenny Dykstra's record, and made the All-Star game. In , his final season in the Cardinals' organization, he played for Double-A New Haven.

New York Mets
On November 20, 2001, he was claimed off waivers by the New York Mets.

He was called up to the majors and made his major league debut on September 3. On September 21, against the Montreal Expos, he got his first major league hit, a single, and also ended the game with a three-run walk-off home run.

Atlanta Braves
Snead became a free agent at the end of the season and signed a minor league contract with the Atlanta Braves on November 10, 2004. He stole 46 bases for Triple-A Richmond, but his season was marred by a suspension. In a game against the Syracuse SkyChiefs, pitcher Dave Bush threw a ball between Snead's legs causing Snead to have to be held back by the catcher. After drawing a walk, he charged Bush while walking to first base and threw his batting helmet at him, causing both benches to clear. 20 members of the Braves were fined including Snead who also drew a 10-game suspension.

Baltimore Orioles
The Baltimore Orioles signed him on January 24, and he played for Triple-A Ottawa. In 41 games, he batted .220 with 15 steals.  The Orioles released Snead on May 21.

References

External links

1976 births
Living people
African-American baseball players
American expatriate baseball players in Canada
Baseball players from Florida
Binghamton Mets players
Major League Baseball outfielders
New Haven Ravens players
New Jersey Cardinals players
New York Mets players
Norfolk Tides players
Ottawa Lynx players
Peoria Chiefs players
Potomac Cannons players
Richmond Braves players
Sportspeople from Fort Myers, Florida
UCF Knights baseball players
21st-century African-American sportspeople
20th-century African-American sportspeople